Carl Pedersen (born 7 February 1888, date of death unknown) was a Danish sports shooter. He competed in three events at the 1920 Summer Olympics.

References

External links
 

1888 births
Year of death missing
Danish male sport shooters
Olympic shooters of Denmark
Shooters at the 1920 Summer Olympics
Sportspeople from the Capital Region of Denmark